Goodman is a town in southeastern Holmes County, Mississippi, United States. Per the 2020 census, the population was 1,258.

History
Goodman was settled by European Americans in 1860. It was first chartered on November 16, 1865, after the end of the Civil War; and rechartered on March 5, 1878. The town is named for the first president of the Mississippi Central Railroad.

Goodman is the birthplace of John A. Lomax (1867–1948), pioneering folklorist, and David Herbert Donald (1920–2009), Pulitzer-prize-winning historian.

Geography
Goodman is located in southeastern Holmes County at  (32.968057, -89.912625), west of the Big Black River. U.S. Route 51 passes through the center of town, leading northeast  to Durant and southwest  to Pickens. Mississippi Highway 14 crosses US 51 near the center of town, leading east  to Kosciusko and west  to Ebenezer. I-55 leads south  to Jackson, the state capital, and north  to Memphis, Tennessee.

Demographics

2020 census

Note: the US Census treats Hispanic/Latino as an ethnic category. This table excludes Latinos from the racial categories and assigns them to a separate category. Hispanics/Latinos can be of any race.

2000 Census
As of the census of 2000, there were 1,252 people, 280 households, and 206 families residing in the town. The population density was 1,523.3 people per square mile (589.5/km2). There were 303 housing units at an average density of 368.7 per square mile (142.7/km2). The racial makeup of the town was 65.81% African American, 33.23% White, 0.16% Native American, and 0.80% from two or more races. Hispanic or Latino of any race were 0.64% of the population.

There were 280 households, out of which 42.1% had children under the age of 18 living with them, 36.4% were married couples living together, 32.9% had a female householder with no husband present, and 26.4% were non-families. 25.7% of all households were made up of individuals, and 9.6% had someone living alone who was 65 years of age or older. The average household size was 2.96 and the average family size was 3.58.

In the town, the population was spread out, with 25.9% under the age of 18, 39.0% from 18 to 24, 18.1% from 25 to 44, 10.1% from 45 to 64, and 6.9% who were 65 years of age or older. The median age was 20 years. For every 100 females, there were 103.6 males. For every 100 females age 18 and over, there were 93.3 males.

The median income for a household in the town was $13,929, and the median income for a family was $14,643. Males had a median income of $30,000 versus $17,500 for females. The per capita income for the town was $8,359. About 49.0% of families and 45.6% of the population were below the poverty line, including 63.0% of those under age 18 and 35.9% of those age 65 or over.

Education
The town of Goodman is served by the Holmes County School District. It is served by Goodman-Pickens Elementary School, between Goodman and Pickens. In 2006 the school had about 379 students. High school students go to Holmes County Central High School.

The Goodman Campus of Holmes Community College (formerly known as Holmes Junior College) is located here.

Notable people 
 Ode Burrell, former American Football League player
 Charles Davis, jazz saxophonist and composer
 Mattie Delaney, Delta blues singer and guitarist
 David Herbert Donald (1920–2009), Pulitzer-prize-winning historian.
 John Lomax, musicologist and folklorist
 Buddy Scott, blues guitarist
 Wirt Williams, novelist, journalist and professor of English, who was three times nominated for the Pulitzer Prize

References

External links
 Pictures of Goodman, MS

Towns in Holmes County, Mississippi
Towns in Mississippi